Maksim Buznikin (born 1 March 1977) is former Russia international forward or attacking midfielder. Buznikin spent his prime years playing for Spartak Moscow and Lokomotiv Moscow. In 2005 Buznikin was chosen Rostov's footballer of the year.

Honours
 Russian Premier League champion: 1997, 1998, 1999, 2000, 2002, 2004.
 Russian Premier League runner-up: 2001.
 Russian Premier League bronze: 2005.
 Russian Cup winner: 1998.
 Russian Super Cup winner: 2003.

International goals

European competitions history
 UEFA Cup 1997–98 with FC Spartak Moscow: 7 games, 1 goal.
 UEFA Champions League 1998–99 with FC Spartak Moscow: 3 games.
 UEFA Champions League 2001–02 with FC Lokomotiv Moscow: 6 games, 3 goals.
 UEFA Cup 2001–02 with FC Lokomotiv Moscow: 1 game.
 UEFA Champions League 2002–03 with FC Lokomotiv Moscow: 9 games.
 UEFA Champions League 2003–04 with FC Lokomotiv Moscow: 6 games, 1 goal.

References

External links
 
 Player profile 

1977 births
Living people
Russian footballers
Russia under-21 international footballers
Russia international footballers
FC Kuban Krasnodar players
FC Lada-Tolyatti players
FC Spartak Moscow players
FC Lokomotiv Moscow players
FC Saturn Ramenskoye players
FC Rotor Volgograd players
FC Rostov players
FC Shinnik Yaroslavl players
Russian Premier League players
FC Baltika Kaliningrad players
FC Nizhny Novgorod (2007) players
Sportspeople from Krasnodar
Association football forwards